Andrew Hill Card Jr. (born May 10, 1947) is an American politician and academic administrator who was White House Chief of Staff under President George W. Bush from 2001 to 2006, as well as head of Bush's White House Iraq Group. Card served as United States Secretary of Transportation under President George H. W. Bush from 1992 to 1993.

Card announced his resignation as Chief of Staff on March 28, 2006, effective April 14, 2006. Card was the Acting Dean of the Bush School of Government and Public Service, at Texas A&M University from 2011 to 2013. In 2014, Card became the president of Franklin Pierce University, serving until he retired from that post in the summer of 2016.

Early life and education
Card was born on May 10, 1947, in Brockton, Massachusetts, the son of Joyce (née Whitaker) and Andrew Hill Card Sr. He was active in the Boy Scouts of America's Old Colony Council and earned the rank of Life Scout. He attended the United States Merchant Marine Academy from 1966 to 1967 before graduating from the University of South Carolina with a Bachelor of Science in civil engineering in 1971. He also attended the John F. Kennedy School of Government at Harvard University.

Career

Early career
Card got his start in politics serving in the Massachusetts House of Representatives from 1975 to 1983. He ran unsuccessfully for the Republican nomination for Governor of Massachusetts in 1982.

Private career
From 1993 to 1998, Card was President and chief executive officer of the American Automobile Manufacturers Association (AAMA), the trade association whose members were Chrysler Corporation, Ford Motor Company and General Motors Corporation. The AAMA dissolved in December 1998. From 1999 until his selection as President Bush's Chief of Staff, Card was General Motors' Vice President of Government Relations. Card directed the company's international, national, state and local government affairs activities and represented GM on matters of public policy before Congress and the Administration.

He serves on the board of directors of Union Pacific Railroad.  The railroad announced on July 27, 2006, that Card was elected to the board, increasing the board's size to 10 members. He is also a senior counselor at public relations firm Fleishman-Hillard.

On November 7, 2019 he joined the board of directors of Draganfly, industry-leading manufacturer within the commercial Unmanned Aerial Vehicle (“UAV”) and the Unmanned Vehicle Systems (“UVS”) space.

Government career

Under Ronald Reagan
Card first served in the West Wing under President Ronald Reagan, as Special Assistant to the President for Intergovernmental Affairs and subsequently as Deputy Assistant to the President, and Director of Intergovernmental Affairs, where he was liaison to governors, statewide elected officials, state legislators, mayors and other elected officials.

Under George H. W. Bush
From 1989 to 1992, Card served in President George H. W. Bush's administration as Assistant to the President and Deputy Chief of Staff. From 1992 until 1993, Card served as the 11th U.S. Secretary of Transportation under President Bush. In August 1992, at the request of President Bush, Secretary Card coordinated the administration's disaster relief efforts in the wake of Hurricane Andrew. Later that year, Secretary Card directed President Bush's transition office during the transition from the Bush Administration to the Clinton Administration.

Under George W. Bush
In 2000, Card was asked by Texas Governor George W. Bush to run the Republican National Convention in Philadelphia.

On November 26, 2000, Card was appointed to be chief of staff for President-elect George W. Bush upon Bush's January 20, 2001 inauguration.

On September 11, 2001, Card approached Bush as he was visiting Emma E. Booker Elementary School in Sarasota, Florida, and whispered in his ear the news that a second plane had hit the World Trade Center, confirming that a terrorist attack was underway. Card later recounted his story, saying that he whispered "A second plane hit the second tower. America is under attack."

On March 28, 2006, the White House announced that Card would resign as Chief of Staff and be replaced by United States Office of Management and Budget director Joshua B. Bolten. Card's resignation was effective April 14, 2006. At 5 years and 84 days, his tenure as Chief of Staff was the second-longest in the office's history.

Post-government career
Card received an honorary degree from the University of Massachusetts Amherst on May 25, 2007. While accepting the degree, Card was booed loudly by students and faculty who deplored the choice to bestow the honor.

Card considered running in the 2010 special election to fill the United States Senate seat held by Ted Kennedy, who had died in office. State Senator Scott Brown, who considered entering the race, promised to drop out if Card decided to run. Card announced on September 11, 2009, that he would not enter the race and that he was throwing his support to Brown, who went on to win the election.

On July 5, 2011, Card was named acting dean of The Bush School of Government and Public Service at Texas A&M University.

In 2014, Card was selected as the fifth president of Franklin Pierce University in Rindge, New Hampshire. He began his tenure in December 2014, and resigned in summer of 2016.

Personal life
Card is married to Reverend Kathleene Card. They reside in Jaffrey, New Hampshire. They have three grown children and six grandchildren.

References

External links

 

|-

|-

|-

|-

|-

|-

|-

1947 births
20th-century American politicians
Franklin Pierce University faculty
George W. Bush administration cabinet members
George H. W. Bush administration cabinet members
Harvard Kennedy School alumni
Living people
Republican Party members of the Massachusetts House of Representatives
People from McLean, Virginia
People from Holbrook, Massachusetts
Politicians from Brockton, Massachusetts
Texas A&M University people
Union Pacific Railroad people
United States Merchant Marine Academy alumni
United States Secretaries of Transportation
University of South Carolina alumni
Virginia Republicans
White House Chiefs of Staff
White House Deputy Chiefs of Staff